Gangsta Harmony is the only solo studio album by American singer and record producer Mo B. Dick. It was released on April 13, 1999 through No Limit Records. Recording sessions took place at The Ice Cream Shop, at Westlake Audio and at The Village Recorder in Los Angeles, and at Enterprise Studios in Burbank, California. Production was handled by Beats By The Pound and Sons of Funk, with Master P serving as executive producer. It features guest appearances from C-Murder, Sons of Funk, Big Ed, Dolliolie, Fiend, KLC, Lil' Gotti, Magic, Mac, Mia X, Mr. Serv-On, O'Dell, Silkk the Shocker, Chub, Claude Achille, and Cool-Ass Alicis. The album peaked at number 66 on the Billboard 200 and number 16 on the Top R&B/Hip-Hop Albums only selling 31,000 copies in its first week. A music video for the single "Shoot' m up Movies" was released.

Track listing

Charts

References

External links

1999 debut albums
No Limit Records albums
Priority Records albums
Hip hop albums by American artists
Albums recorded at Westlake Recording Studios